This is a list of Sri Lankan Australians, people who are of Sri Lankan heritage living in Australia. "Sri Lankan Australians" refers to all ethnic groups in Sri Lanka, but they are mainly the Sinhalese, Sri Lankan Tamils and Burghers.

Academics
 Christie Jayaratnam Eliezer – academic
 Sisira Jayasuriya – professor of economics at La Trobe University
 Michael Muthukrishna – professor of psychological sciences at London School of Economics
 Christopher Weeramantry – Emeritus Professor at Monash University
 Mahinda Vilathgamuwa – Professor of Electrical Engineering and Computer Science, Queensland University of Technology
 Wije Danthanarayana – Emeritus Professor of Zoology at La Trobe University
 Sean Perera - Academic at The Australian National University

Authors
 Michelle de Kretser – author
 Dipti Saravanamuttu – poet and academic

Businesspeople
 Shanaka Fernando – founder of Melbourne not-for-profit restaurant group 'Lentil as Anything' (a joke on the rock group Mental As Anything); 2007 Australian Local Hero Award recipient
 Shemara Wikramanayake – CEO of Macquarie Group
 Terence Jeyaretnam – founder of one of Australia's first B Corps Net Balance, which was acquired by Ernst & Young (EY) in 2014. Terence is a board member of Global Citizen Australia and Fairtrade Australia & New Zealand and a Partner at EY.

Chefs
 Geoff Jansz – Nine Network TV chef
 Peter Kuruvita – chef
 Charmaine Solomon – cookbook author

Media and entertainment
 Virosh Perera Publisher of First Serendib news the Sri Lankan Newspaper in Australia 
 Vernon Abeysekera – Director of Radio Ceylon and civil servant
 Karina Carvalho – ABC journalist
 Avani Dias – Hack host (2020–present) and journalist
 Jamie Durie – Seven Network media personality
 Joshua Heuston – model and actor
 Nazeem Hussain – comedian, actor, television and radio presenter 
 Dilruk Jayasinha – comedian and actor ( Winner – Most Popular New Talent, Logie Awards 2018 )
 Ernest MacIntyre – playwright
 Sarah Roberts – television and film actress
 Pria Viswalingam – SBS journalist

Musicians
 Andrew De Silva – R&B and rock singer, winner of Australia's Got Talent in 2012
 Candy Devine – musician, actress
 Cliff Foenander – leading musician with the Fabulous Echoes
 Clarence Jey – Billboard Hot 100 record producer, musician
 Kamahl – singer and actor (born in Malaysia)
 Desmond Kelly – musician and actor
 Alston Koch – musician
 Keith Potger – musician, founding member of the Seekers
 Guy Sebastian – first winner of Australian Idol
 Amali Ward – Australian Idol contestant, singer
 Ecca Vandal – South African-born, Sri Lankan Tamil musician

Politics
 Virosh Perera Federal Liberal Candidate for Scullin
 David de Kretser – Governor of Victoria
 Palitha Kohona – former Permanent Secretary to the Sri Lankan Ministry of Foreign Affairs
 Anton Muttukumaru – ex Army Commander of Ceylon and high Commissioner to Australia, New Zealand, Pakistan and Ambassador to Egypt
 Shiva Pasupati – longest serving Attorney General of Sri Lanka (former); human rights activist
 Jude Perera – State Member for Cranbourne District in the Victorian Legislative Assembly
 Jonathan Sriranganathan – Councillor for The Gabba Ward in the Brisbane City Council
 Urfa Masood - Magistrate Court of Victoria

Religion
 Ameer Ali – ex-President of the Australian Federation of Islamic Councils
 Roger Herft – Archbishop of Perth
 Danny Nalliah – Christian evangelist pastor
 Gangodawila Soma Thero – chief incumbent of Buddhist Temple Victoria

Sportspeople
 Ashton Agar – cricket player
 Ishara Amerasinghe – cricketer
 Saliya Ahangama – cricketer and coach
 Hayden Crozier – AFL player
 Chamara Dunusinghe – cricketer
 Jacynta Galabadaarachchi – woman footballer
 Yohan Goonasekera – cricketer
 Gamini Goonesena – cricketer
 Kusal Goonewardena – physical therapist and health lecturer
 Asanka Gurusinha – cricketer
 Chandika Hathurusingha – cricketer and coach
 Suresh Joachim – Guinness world record holder
 Sanath Kaluperuma – cricketer
 Kosala Kuruppuarachchi – cricketer
 Gabriella Pound – women's AFL player
 Ravi Ratnayeke – cricketer
 Athula Samarasekera – cricketer
 Prashanth Sellathurai – professional gymnast who competed in New Delhi Commonwealth Games
 Sawan Serasinghe – professional badminton player and Olympian 
 Tania Van Heer – sprinter
 Dav Whatmore – coach of the Sri Lanka and Bangladesh cricket teams
 Vineetha Wijesuriya – chess player
 Jamie Young – footballer

See also
 List of Sri Lankans

References

Sri Lankan
 
a
Sri Lankan